Shahru or Shahroo or Shahrow may refer to:
Shahru, Hormozgan
Shahru, alternate name of Demshar-e Khurgu
Shahru, alternate name of Sarkhun, Hormozgan
Shahru, alternate name of Shahrow, Isin
Shahru, alternate name of Shahrow, Tazian
Shahru, Lorestan